Kingsley Jones may refer to:

Kingsley Jones (rugby union, born 1935) (1935–2003) 
Kingsley Jones (rugby union, born 1969) (born 1969)